Saumitra Rawat is an Indian surgical gastroenterologist and the head of Surgical Gastroenterology and Liver Transplant at Sir Ganga Ram Hospital, New Delhi. The Government of India honoured him in 2015 with the award of Padma Shri.

Biography
Saumitra Rawat was born on 23 September 1965. He graduated in medicine in 1988 and secured his master's degree in 1992 from Maulana Azad Medical College, Delhi. After his senior residency, Rawat went to UK in 1995 for advanced training in laparoscopic, Gastroenterology (GI) and Hepato-pancreatico-biliary (HPB) surgery at Leeds. He served as an undergraduate lecturer at University of Manchester and, later, as a Postgraduate trainer at the University of Liverpool. He received the fellowship of the Royal College of Surgeons of Glasgow in 1997 and the Royal College of Surgeons of Edinburgh in 1998. He worked as a surgical tutor at the Royal College of Surgeons of England and as a consultant at such institutions as Glasgow Royal Infirmary, East Cheshire NHS Trust and Christie Hospital NHS Foundation Trust. During this period, he also received the fellowship of the Royal College of Surgeons of England. He returned to India in 2012 and took up the position of the Head of the Department of Surgical Gastroenterology and Liver Transplant at Sir Ganga Ram Hospital, New Delhi and is its chairman. He continues to serve Christie Hospital NHS Foundation Trust, Manchester as an honorary consultant and is associated with the Royal College of Surgeons of England as a member of its Court of Examiners.

Legacy and positions
Rawat's contributions are reported in bringing laparoscopic and robotic surgery for Gastrointestinal cancer to Sir Ganga Ram Hospital. He and his team is credited with the first successful performance of robotic and laparoscopic Oesophagectomy in North India, the first robotic hepatico-jejunostomy in India and the first low anterior resection in North India. Reports also credit him with the introduction of an Enhanced recovery programme for cancer Surgery. Besides publishing several articles in peer reviewed journals, he has also contributed to Oxford Handbook of Clinical Surgery and Operative Surgery, two reference books published by Oxford University Press.

Rawat is the editor of the Indian edition of Diseases of the Colon and Rectum, the official journal of the American Society of Colon and Rectal Surgeons. He is a member of professional bodies and societies such as the Association of Surgeons of Great Britain and Ireland, Association of Upper Gastrointestinal Surgeons of Great Britain and Ireland, British Medical Association, British Transplant Society, Association of Laparoscopic Surgeons of Great Britain and Ireland, International Federation for the Surgery of Obesity, British Obesity and Metabolic Surgery Society, Indian Medical Association and the Association of Surgeons of India. He has participated in several conferences, workshops and CME classes as moderator, coordinator and organizer, Vision 2020 - Young Indian Leaders Conclave was one such event.

Awards and recognitions
Rawat is a recipient of Academic Excellence Award from Delhi Medical Association and has also received awards from the three laparoscopic surgery societies operating in India such as Indian Association of Gastrointestinal Endo Surgeons (IAGES), Association of Minimal Access Surgeons of India (AMASI), Society of Endoscopic and Laparoscopic Surgeons of India (SELSI). He has received the Bundelkhand Gaurav Samman from Union Minister, Uma Bharti. The Government of India included him in the 66th Republic Day honours list, in 2015, for the civilian award of Padma Shri.

References

Further reading

External links
 
 

Indian medical academics
Indian gastroenterologists
Indian surgeons
Indian medical researchers
Indian medical writers
People from Jhansi
Recipients of the Padma Shri in medicine
Maulana Azad College alumni
Academics of the University of Liverpool
Living people
1965 births
20th-century Indian medical doctors
Medical doctors from Uttar Pradesh
20th-century surgeons